David Martínez may refer to:
 David Martínez (racing driver) (born 1981), Mexican racing driver
 David Martínez (discus thrower) (born 1967), retired discus thrower from Spain
 David Martínez (baseball) (born 1987), Venezuelan professional baseball pitcher
 David Martínez (businessman) (born 1957), Mexican businessman, managing partner of Fintech Advisory
 David Ferreyra Martínez (born 1973), Mexican politician
 David Martínez (footballer, born 1998), Paraguayan football centre-back
 David Martínez (footballer, born 2006), Venezuelan football forward

See also
Dave Martinez (born 1964), American baseball manager and former outfielder